This page lists the 47 communes of the Val-de-Marne department of France on 1 January 2021. Since January 2016, all communes of the department are part of the intercommunality Métropole du Grand Paris.

List of communes

Urbanism

References 

Val-de-Marne